This is a list of persons known for work in computational chemistry.

 Reinhart Ahlrichs (1940–2016), developer of TURBOMOLE
 Norman Allinger (c. 1928–2020), developer of force fields for molecular dynamics
 Evert Jan Baerends (1945–), developer of Amsterdam Density Functional
 Kim K. Baldridge, works to develop quantum mechanical methodologies and apply quantum chemical methods to problems in life sciences, materials science, and general studies. She has contributed to programs such as GAMESS (US), QMView, and GEMSTONE.
 Elena Besley, works on the development of theoretical and computational methods for the prediction of materials properties
 Michael Buehl (1962–), known for his work on modelling of homogeneous catalysis and molecular dynamics of transition metal complexes
 Roberto Car (1947–), developer of Car–Parrinello method
 Emily A. Carter, known for orbital free DFT
 Charusita Chakravarty (1964–2016), known for her specialised application of path integral Monte Carlo simulation to unravel quantum mechanical effects in the properties of atomic and molecular cluster
 James R. Chelikowsky, developer of PARSEC
 G Marius Clore  FRS (1955–), known for development of simulated annealing methods for solving three-dimensional structures of proteins and nucleic acids by NMR. Co-developer of XPLOR-NIH and  CNS
 Clémence Corminboeuf (1977–), developing and applying state of the art computational methods for interpreting and solving chemical problems in complex systems
 David P. Craig (1919–2015), known for Ab initio quantum chemistry methods
 Nora de Leeuw, known for her work on biomaterials, sustainable energy, and carbon capture and storage
 Margaret Oakley Dayhoff (1925–1983), pioneered the application of mathematics and computational methods to the field of biochemistry
 Michael J. S. Dewar (1918–1997), developer of MOPAC
 Robert Dirks (1978–2015), known for work in nucleic acid structure prediction and design
 Inga Fischer-Hjalmars (1918–2008), known as one of the pioneers in the application of quantum mechanics to solve problems in theoretical chemistry
 Vladimir Fock (1898–1974), developer of Hartree–Fock method
 Kenichi Fukui (1918–1998), Japanese theoretical chemist, 1981 Nobel Prize in Chemistry winner for theories of chemical reactivity
 Richard A. Friesner (1952–), developer of Jaguar
 Laura Gagliardi (1968–), known for her work on the development of electronic structure methods and their use for understanding complex chemical systems
Giulia Galli
 Jürgen Gauß, developer of CFOUR and ACES III
 William Andrew Goddard III, developer of Jaguar and ReaxFF
 Leticia González (1971–), known for her work on molecular excited states, especially ultrafast dynamics of DNA nucleobases and highly accurate simulations of transition metal complexes
 Mark S. Gordon (1942–), developer of GAMESS (US)
 Sharon Hammes-Schiffer (1966–) developer of a general theory for proton-coupled electron transfer (PCET) 
 Corwin Hansch (1918–2011), known for the Hansch equation and for QSAR
 Douglas Hartree (1897–1958), developer of Hartree–Fock method
 Martin Head-Gordon (1962–), developer of Q-Chem
 Teresa Head-Gordon, develops theoretical models that are used in chemical physics and biophysics
 Trygve Helgaker (1953–), developer of Dalton
 Kersti Hermansson, researches on condensed-matter chemistry including the investigation of chemical bonding and development of quantum chemical methods
 Kendall N. Houk (1943–), well-known for using the tools of computational chemistry to study organic, organometallic, and biological reactions
 Poul Jørgensen (1944–), developer of Dalton
 William L. Jorgensen (1949–), developer of BOSS and OPLS
 Martin Karplus (1930–), winner of the 2013 Nobel Prize in Chemistry for "the development of multiscale models for complex chemical systems"
 Walter Kohn (1923–2016), winner of 1998 Nobel Prize in Chemistry "for his development of the density-functional theory", developer of Kohn–Sham equations
 Peter Kollman (1944–2001), developer of AMBER force field
 Anna Krylov  (1967–), inventor of the spin-flip method
 Włodzimierz Kołos (1928–1996), pioneer of accurate calculations on the electronic structure of molecules
 Cyrus Levinthal (1922–1990), father of computer display of protein structure
 Michael Levitt (1947–), winner of the 2013 Nobel Prize in Chemistry for "the development of multiscale models for complex chemical systems"
 Hans Lischka (1943–), developer of COLUMBUS
 Benedetta Mennucci (1969–), developer of continuum solvation methods
 Keiji Morokuma (1934–2017), Japanese theoretical chemist, developer of ONIOM methods
 Debashis Mukherjee (1946–) Indian theoretical chemist known for contributions to many-body electronic structure theory
 Robert Sanderson Mulliken (1896–1986) American theoretical chemist, winner of the 1966 Nobel Prize f9r Chemistry for molecular orbital theory
 Frank Neese (1967–), lead author of the ORCA quantum chemistry program package
 Anthony Nicholls, developer of DelPhi and CEO of OpenEye Scientific Software 
 Odile Eisenstein (1949–), a theoretical chemist who specializes in modelling the structure and reactivity of transition metals
 Rudolph Pariser (1923–), developer of Pariser–Parr–Pople method
 Robert Parr (1921–2017), developer of Pariser–Parr–Pople method
 Michele Parrinello (1945–), developer of Car–Parrinello method
 Sigrid D. Peyerimhoff (1937–), contributed to the development of multireference configuration interaction
 John Pople (1925–2004), winner of 1998 Nobel Prize in Chemistry "for his development of computational methods in quantum chemistry", developer of Pariser–Parr–Pople method
 Alberte Pullman (1920–2011), pioneered the application of quantum chemistry to predicting the carcinogenic properties of aromatic hydrocarbons.
 :de:Sereina Riniker, Professor at ETH Zurich, renowned for her work in Molecular Dynamics and Chemoinformatics
 Ursula Rothlisberger, developer of QM/MM methods
 Kenneth Ruud (1969–), developer of Dalton
 Yousef Saad, developer of PARSEC
 Chris Sander, developer of WHAT IF
 Joachim Sauer (1949–), codeveloper of QMPOT
 Henry F. Schaefer, III (1944–), director of the Center for Computational Chemistry and developer of PSI (computational chemistry)
Annabella Selloni
 Lu Jeu Sham (1938–), developer of Kohn–Sham equations
 Carlos Simmerling, developer of AMBER force field
 Hertha Sponer (1895–1968), contributed to modern quantum mechanics
 Donald Truhlar (1944–), developer of Minnesota functionals
 Giovanni Vignale (1957–), known for density functional theory
 Saraswathi Vishveshwara, uses computational-mathematical techniques to understand the functioning of macromolecules such as proteins
 Arieh Warshel (1940–), winner of the 2013 Nobel Prize in Chemistry for "the development of multiscale models for complex chemical systems"
 Weitao Yang (1961–), known for density functional theory
 David Weininger (1952–2016), known for the SMILES chemical line notation
 Angela K. Wilson, an American physical, theoretical, and computational chemist.
Lynn Kamerlin, (1981–) a theoretical organic chemist and one of the original developers of the Q software.